Sir Nicholas Dominic Cadbury (born 12 May 1940) is a British businessman and member of the Cadbury chocolate manufacturing dynasty. He was the sixth chancellor of University of Birmingham, stepping down in 2014.

Early life
Cadbury was born on 12 May 1940, the son of Laurence John Cadbury and Joyce Cadbury, and the grandson of George Cadbury. He was educated at Eton College. After graduating from Trinity College, Cambridge, he completed his Master of Business Administration (MBA) at Stanford University.

Career
Cadbury joined Cadbury Schweppes in 1964. He was appointed to the board in 1975, serving as group chief executive from 1983 to 1993, then as chairman until his planned retirement on his 60th birthday on 12 May 2000.

His non-executive positions include chairman of the Economist Group and joint deputy chairman of EMI. He is also a member of the Council of Management of the National Institute of Economic and Social Research. Since November 2005 he is the chairman of Misys plc.

Cadbury was appointed chancellor of the University of Birmingham on 2 May 2002 upon the retirement of Sir Alex Jarratt. In 2013 he was succeeded by Lord Bilimoria.

Family
He married Cecilia Sarah Symes in 1972 and they had three daughters. His brother, Sir Adrian Cadbury, was also a former Cadbury company executive.

Honours
Cadbury was knighted in the 1997 Birthday Honours.

References

1940 births
Living people
People educated at Eton College
Alumni of Trinity College, Cambridge
Chancellors of the University of Birmingham
Cadbury
British chief executives
British chairpersons of corporations
Businesspeople awarded knighthoods
Knights Bachelor